Vermilion Range may refer to:

 Vermilion Range (Alberta), Canada
 Vermilion Range (British Columbia), Canada
 Vermilion Range (Minnesota), United States
 Vermilion Range (SoC), the EP80578 Integrated Processor family of embedded SoCs made by Intel